Samantaral is a 2017 Indian Bengali-language psychological drama film, directed by Partha Chakraborty. It stars Parambrata Chatterjee and Riddhi Sen. It was nominated at the 2018 Filmfare Awards for Best Film (Critics). Chatterjee received nominations for Best Actor in a Leading Role (Male) - Popular and Critics Award for Best Actor (Male).

Plot 
Arko ( Riddhi Sen ) returns to his 'mamarbari' (maternal uncles' house) to meet his extended family. Over there, he meets his second uncle Sujan (Parambrata Chatterjee) who is always locked in a room because of his presumed mental illness. Arko takes permission from his grandfather (Soumitra Chatterjee) to allow him to take Sujan out of the house for some time, much to the chagrin of his other uncles (Kushal Chakraborty and Anindya Banerjee) and aunt (Tanusree Chakraborty). As Arko sees his uncle more closely, he realizes that something very wrong has happened to him and the family is hiding a secret. Finally it has been revealed that uncle Sujan is intersex and the family has always wanted to keep this identity shut from outside world. Uncle Sujan commits suicide at the end and donates his eyes to his abusive younger brother (Anindya Banerjee).

Cast
Parambrata Chatterjee as Sujan 
Riddhi Sen as Arko 
Soumitra Chatterjee as Akhilesh Chatterjee, Sujan's father 
Surangana Bandyopadhyay as Titli, Arko's girlfriend 
Kushal Chakraborty as Supriyo, the eldest son 
Aparajita Adhya as Raai, Eldest daughter-in-law 
Anindya Banerjee as Kaushik, the youngest son 
Tanusree Chakraborty as Piya, youngest daughter-in-law
Sayantani Guhathakurta as Runi, youngest daughter, Arko's mother (deceased) 
Siddhartha Roy as Sambit, the psychiatrist

References

External links 
 

2017 films
Bengali-language Indian films
2010s Bengali-language films